Alexander Reginald Isserlis (18 May 1922 - 20 December 1986), sometimes called Sandy Isserlis, was a British civil servant who served as Principal Private Secretary to the Prime Minister of the United Kingdom in 1970.

Isserlis did not serve as Edward Heath's private secretary because he had been "personally close" to Heath's predecessor Harold Wilson.

Works
Isserlis was author of:
Regional Devolution and National Government (1975)
Corporatism and Social Policy (1976)
The Usefulness of Political Science to the Public Service (1978)
Plus Ca Change (1981)
Conversations on Policy (1984).

References

Sources
Rubinstein, Jolles, and Rubinstein (eds). "Isserlis, Alexander Reginald". The Palgrave Dictionary of Anglo-Jewish History. Palgrave Macmillan. 2011. Pages 460 and 461.
The Times. 24 April 1970.
The Times. 10 July 1970.
The Times. 2 September 1970.
Jewish Chronicle. 1 May 1970.
Peter Paterson, "Why not a spoils system?" (1970) 225 The Spectator 32 (18 July 1970)
"People" (1970) 38 Town and Country Planning 259
Andrew Holt and Warren Dockter (eds). Private Secretaries to the Prime Minister. Routledge. 2017. Pages PT323, PT326 and passim.
John Davis. Prime Ministers and Whitehall 1960-74. Hambledon Continuum. 2007. Page 76.
Kevin Theakston (ed). Bureaucrats and Leadership. Macmillan Press. 2000. Page 83.
Peter Hennessy. The Prime Minister: The Office and Its Holders Since 1945. Palgrave, for St Martins Press. 2001. Page 340.
Stuart Ball and Anthony Seldon. The Heath Government, 1970-1974: A Reappraisal. Addison Wesley Longman. 1996. Routledge. 2013. Pages 62, 75 and 85.
Kellner and Crowther-Hunt. The Civil Servants. Macdonald. 1980. Page 77.
State of Emergency: The Way We Were: Britain, 1970-1974. Allen Lane. 2010. Page 53. Penguin Books. 2011. PT80.
Griffith (ed). From Policy to Administration. PT12, PT24 and PT25.

1922 births
1986 deaths
British civil servants
Principal Private Secretaries to the Prime Minister
Civil servants in the Ministry of Health (United Kingdom)
Private secretaries in the British Civil Service
Civil servants in the Ministry of Housing and Local Government
Civil servants in the Cabinet Office
Civil servants in the Home Office